Stradling Yocca Carlson & Rauth is a law firm headquartered in Newport Beach, employing approximately 130 attorneys, and focusing on areas of law including corporate law including mergers and acquisitions and business litigation, intellectual property, labor and employment, real estate, public law, and tax.

The firm was founded in 1975 by Nick Yocca, C. Craig Carlson, Bill Rauth and K.C. Schaaf.

References

Intellectual property law firms
Law firms based in California